Lauvdal is a village in the municipality of Bygland in Agder county, Norway. It's located along the Norwegian National Road 9 on the east side of Byglandsfjorden. The population (2001) was 41 residents.

The area has yielded numerous historical artifacts, including a silver-tipped spear now exhibited at a museum in Oslo. Lauvdal was once known for substantial cow and pig farming, but today features only two farms.

Attractions
The Hagen crofter's cottage is located in the north part of Lauvdal. This was occupied until the 1960s and has stood unused since then. It is now part of the Setesdal Museum collection.

Notable residents
Åsulv Lande, a professor of theology at Lund University
Gunvor Lande, a doctor of theology at the University of Agder
Vidar Lande, a professor at Telemark University College and folk musician

References

External links
Priority cultural landscapes in Bygland 2006
Hagen Crofter's Cottage
Silver-tipped spear found in Lauvdal

Villages in Agder
Setesdal
Bygland